Virginia's 54th House of Delegates district elects one of 100 seats in the Virginia House of Delegates, the lower house of the state's bicameral legislature. District 54, in Spotsylvania County and Caroline County, Virginia, has been represented by Republican Bobby Orrock since 1990.

2017 election 
In 2017, Orrock ran against gun rights activist Nick Ignacio in the Republican primary and Democrat Al Durante, a retired teacher who chairs the Spotsylvania Democratic Committee, in the general election.

Electoral history

References

External links
 

Virginia House of Delegates districts
Spotsylvania County, Virginia
Caroline County, Virginia